The 2002 Victorian Football League season was the 121st season of the Australian rules football competition.

The premiership was won by the Geelong Football Club reserves team, after defeating Port Melbourne by 22 points in the Grand Final on 22 September.

Premiership season

Round 1

|- bgcolor="#CCCCFF"
| Home team
| Home team score
| Away team
| Away team score
| Ground
| Date
| Time
|- bgcolor="#FFFFFF"
|Tasmania|| 12.4 (76) ||Geelong reserves|| 12.15 (87) ||York Park|| Friday, 5 April || 6pm
|- bgcolor="#FFFFFF"
|Carlton reserves|| 6.6 (42) ||Port Melbourne|| 13.18 (96) ||Optus Oval|| Saturday, 6 April || 10:50am
|- bgcolor="#FFFFFF"
|Bendigo Diggers|| 15.8 (98) ||Springvale|| 21.14 (140) ||Queen Elizabeth Oval|| Saturday, 6 April || 2pm
|- bgcolor="#FFFFFF"
|Coburg Tigers|| 20.12 (132)||Essendon reserves|| 14.10 (94) || Coburg City Oval|| Saturday, 6 April || 1:10pm
|- bgcolor="#FFFFFF"
|Frankston|| 12.10 (82) ||Sandringham|| 20.12 (132) ||Frankston Park|| Saturday, 6 April || 2pm
|- bgcolor="#FFFFFF"
|North Ballarat|| 12.8 (80) ||Williamstown|| 17.12 (114) ||Northern Oval|| Sunday, 7 April || 2pm
|- bgcolor="#FFFFFF"
|Werribee|| 11.13 (79) ||Murray Kangaroos|| 22.7 (139) ||Chirnside Park|| Sunday, 7 April || 2pm
|- bgcolor="#FFFFFF"
|Northern Bullants|| 13.6 (84) ||Box Hill Hawks|| 23.16 (154) ||Preston City Oval|| Sunday, 7 April || 2pm

Round 2

|- bgcolor="#CCCCFF"
| Home team
| Home team score
| Away team
| Away team score
| Ground
| Date
| Time
|- bgcolor="#FFFFFF"
|Box Hill Hawks|| 20.17 (137) ||Bendigo Diggers|| 9.6 (60) ||Box Hill City Oval|| Saturday, 13 April || 2pm
|- bgcolor="#FFFFFF"
|Werribee|| 15.10 (100) ||North Ballarat|| 12.11 (83) ||Chirnside Park|| Saturday, 13 April || 1:10pm
|- bgcolor="#FFFFFF"
|Springvale|| 14.16 (100) ||Frankston|| 7.6 (48) ||Moorabbin|| Saturday, 13 April || 2pm
|- bgcolor="#FFFFFF"
|Williamstown|| 19.10 (124) ||Carlton reserves|| 18.15 (123) ||W.C.G.|| Saturday, 13 April || 2pm
|- bgcolor="#FFFFFF"
|Sandringham|| 13.10 (88) ||Coburg Tigers|| 10.11 (71) ||Trevor Barker Beach Oval|| Sunday, 14 April || 2pm
|- bgcolor="#FFFFFF"
|Port Melbourne|| 12.10 (82) ||Tasmania|| 14.13 (97)  ||TEAC Oval|| Sunday, 14 April || 2pm
|- bgcolor="#FFFFFF"
|Murray Kangaroos|| 14.12 (96) ||Geelong reserves|| 12.15 (87) ||Coburg City Oval|| Sunday, 14 April || 2pm
|- bgcolor="#FFFFFF"
|Northern Bullants|| 14.11 (95)||Essendon reserves|| 13.11 (89) ||Preston City Oval|| Sunday, 14 April || 2pm

Round 3

|- bgcolor="#CCCCFF"
| Home team
| Home team score
| Away team
| Away team score
| Ground
| Date
| Time
|- bgcolor="#FFFFFF"
|Frankston|| 9.8 (62) ||Carlton reserves || 15.15 (105) ||Frankston Oval|| Saturday, 20 April || 1:10pm
|- bgcolor="#FFFFFF"
|Tasmania|| 22.10 (142) ||Essendon reserves|| 17.11 (113) ||North Hobart Oval|| Saturday, 20 April || 1:10pm
|- bgcolor="#FFFFFF"
|Geelong reserves|| 21.17 (143) ||Springvale|| 7.10 (52) ||Skilled Stadium|| Sunday, 21 April || 10:50am
|- bgcolor="#FFFFFF"
|Box Hill Hawks|| 18.17 (125) ||Williamstown|| 13.4 (82) ||Box Hill City Oval|| Sunday, 21 April || 2pm
|- bgcolor="#FFFFFF"
|North Ballarat|| 9.10 (64) ||Sandringham|| 14.13 (97) || Northern Oval|| Sunday, 21 April || 2pm
|- bgcolor="#FFFFFF"
|Northern Bullants|| 10.10 (70) ||Werribee|| 18.16 (124) ||Preston City Oval|| Sunday, 21 April || 2pm
|- bgcolor="#FFFFFF"
|Murray Kangaroos|| 13.14 (92) ||Port Melbourne|| 12.10 (82) ||Coburg City Oval|| Sunday, 21 April || 2pm
|- bgcolor="#FFFFFF"
|Bendigo Diggers|| 15.6 (96) ||Coburg Tigers|| 17.11 (113) ||Queen Elizabeth Oval|| Sunday, 21 April || 2pm

Round 4

|- bgcolor="#CCCCFF"
| Home team
| Home team score
| Away team
| Away team score
| Ground
| Date
| Time
|- bgcolor="#FFFFFF"
|Tasmania|| 11.12 (78)||Frankston|| 11.6 (72) ||North Hobart Oval||Thursday, 25 April||12:30pm
|- bgcolor="#FFFFFF"
|Murray Kangaroos|| 10.9 (69) ||Carlton reserves || 15.9 (99) ||Coburg City Oval||Saturday, 27 April||2pm
|- bgcolor="#FFFFFF"
|Williamstown|| 13.4 (82) ||Essendon reserves|| 12.11 (83) ||W.C.G.|| Saturday, 27 April || 1:10pm
|- bgcolor="#FFFFFF"
|Geelong reserves|| 31.17 (203) ||Bendigo Diggers|| 6.6 (42) ||Skilled Stadium|| Saturday, 27 April||2pm
|- bgcolor="#FFFFFF"
|Northern Bullants|| 11.8 (74) ||North Ballarat|| 14.6 (90) ||Preston City Oval|| Sunday, 28 April||2pm
|- bgcolor="#FFFFFF"
|Coburg Tigers|| 16.9 (105) ||Box Hill Hawks|| 13.14 (92) ||Coburg City Oval|| Sunday, 28 April||2pm
|- bgcolor="#FFFFFF"
|Port Melbourne|| 14.15 (99) ||Springvale|| 11.15 (81) ||TEAC Oval|| Sunday, 28 April||2pm
|- bgcolor="#FFFFFF"
|Sandringham|| 11.14 (80) ||Werribee|| 11.17 (83) ||Trevor Barker Beach Oval|| Sunday, 28 April||2pm

Round 5

|- bgcolor="#CCCCFF"
| Home team
| Home team score
| Away team
| Away team score
| Ground
| Date
| Time
|- bgcolor="#FFFFFF"
|Tasmania|| 12.7 (79) ||Coburg Tigers|| 19.15 (129) ||North Hobart Oval||Saturday, 4 May||2pm
|- bgcolor="#FFFFFF"
|Williamstown|| 10.17 (77) ||Springvale|| 11.15 (81) ||W.C.G.||Saturday, 4 May||1:10pm
|- bgcolor="#FFFFFF"
|Box Hill Hawks|| 22.13 (145) ||Murray Kangaroos|| 17.14 (116) ||Box Hill City Oval ||Sunday, 5 May||2pm
|- bgcolor="#FFFFFF"
|North Ballarat|| 15.8 (98) ||Frankston|| 13.11 (89)||Northern Oval||Sunday, 5 May||2pm
|- bgcolor="#FFFFFF"
|Bendigo Diggers|| 11.10 (76) ||Essendon reserves|| 27.17 (179) ||Queen Elizabeth Oval||Sunday, 5 May||2pm
|- bgcolor="#FFFFFF"
|Geelong reserves|| 14.11 (95) ||Northern Bullants|| 11.13 (79) ||Skilled Stadium|| Sunday, 5 May||2pm
|- bgcolor="#FFFFFF"
|Sandringham|| 18.24 (132) ||Port Melbourne|| 13.10 (88) ||Trevor Barker Beach Oval|| Sunday, 5 May||2pm
|- bgcolor="#FFFFFF"
|Werribee|| 15.14 (104) ||Carlton reserves|| 8.7 (55) ||Chirnside Park|| Sunday, 5 May||2pm

Round 6

|- bgcolor="#CCCCFF"
| Home team
| Home team score
| Away team
| Away team score
| Ground
| Date
| Time
|- bgcolor="#FFFFFF"
|Bendigo Diggers|| 11.7 (73) ||Tasmania||23.12 (150)||Queen Elizabeth Oval|| Saturday, 11 May||1pm
|- bgcolor="#FFFFFF"
|Frankston|| 11.12 (78) ||Northern Bullants|| 20.12 (132) ||Frankston Oval||Saturday, 11 May||2pm
|- bgcolor="#FFFFFF"
|Sandringham|| 12.8 (80) ||Springvale|| 11.15 (81) ||Trevor Barker Beach Oval||Saturday, 11 May||2pm
|- bgcolor="#FFFFFF"
|Williamstown|| 11.9 (75) ||Werribee|| 16.14 (110) ||W.C.G.||Saturday, 11 May||2pm
|- bgcolor="#FFFFFF"
|Carlton reserves|| 18.12 (120) ||Essendon reserves|| 14.9 (93) ||Optus Oval||Saturday, 11 May||2pm
|- bgcolor="#FFFFFF"
|Murray Kangaroos|| 18.19 (127) ||North Ballarat|| 15.5 (95) ||Coburg City Oval||Sunday, 12 May||2pm
|- bgcolor="#FFFFFF"
|Box Hill Hawks|| 18.11 (119) ||Geelong reserves|| 15.10 (100) ||Box Hill City Oval||Sunday, 12 May||2pm
|- bgcolor="#FFFFFF"
|Port Melbourne|| 14.15 (99) ||Coburg Tigers|| 8.10 (58) ||TEAC Oval||Sunday, 12 May||2pm

Round 7

|- bgcolor="#CCCCFF"
| Home team
| Home team score
| Away team
| Away team score
| Ground
| Date
| Time
|- bgcolor="#FFFFFF"
|Port Melbourne|| 13.12 (90) ||Werribee|| 12.8 (80) ||TEAC Oval||Saturday, 18 May||2pm
|- bgcolor="#FFFFFF"
|Springvale|| 7.10 (52) ||Essendon reserves|| 15.13 (103) ||Shepley Oval||Saturday, 18 May||2pm
|- bgcolor="#FFFFFF"
|Carlton reserves|| 9.10 (64) ||Box Hill Hawks|| 18.15 (123) ||Princes Park||Saturday, 18 May||2pm
|- bgcolor="#FFFFFF"
|Tasmania|| 10.8 (68) ||Murray Kangaroos|| 14.15 (99) ||York Park||Saturday, 18 May||6pm
|- bgcolor="#FFFFFF"
|North Ballarat|| 7.10 (52) ||Coburg Tigers|| 12.4 (76) ||Northern Oval||Sunday, 19 May||2pm
|- bgcolor="#FFFFFF"
|Geelong reserves|| 22.8 (140) ||Frankston|| 11.8 (74) ||Skilled Stadium||Sunday, 19 May||2pm
|- bgcolor="#FFFFFF"
|Sandringham|| 20.22 (142) ||Bendigo Diggers|| 5.8 (38) ||Trevor Barker Beach Oval|| Sunday, 19 May||2pm
|- bgcolor="#FFFFFF"
|Northern Bullants|| 12.8 (80) ||Williamstown|| 18.12 (120) ||Preston City Oval|| Sunday, 19 May||2pm

Round 8

|- bgcolor="#CCCCFF"
| Home team
| Home team score
| Away team
| Away team score
| Ground
| Date
| Time
|- bgcolor="#FFFFFF"
|Geelong reserves|| 13.8 (86) ||Werribee|| 10.7 (67) ||Skilled Stadium||Saturday, 25 May||10:50am
|- bgcolor="#FFFFFF"
|Tasmania|| 13.16 (94) ||Carlton reserves|| 19.15 (129) ||North Hobart Oval||Saturday, 25 May||1:10pm
|- bgcolor="#FFFFFF"
|Box Hill Hawks|| 22.15 (147) ||North Ballarat|| 8.8 (56) ||Box Hill City Oval||Saturday, 25 May||2pm
|- bgcolor="#FFFFFF"
|Williamstown||22.19 (151) ||Frankston|| 12.7 (79) ||W.C.G.||Saturday, 25 May||2pm
|- bgcolor="#FFFFFF"
|Murray Kangaroos|| 18.6 (114) ||Sandringham|| 14.18 (102) ||Lavington Sports Ground||Sunday, 26 May||2pm
|- bgcolor="#FFFFFF"
|Coburg Tigers|| 20.8 (128) ||Springvale|| 11.7 (73) ||Coburg City Oval||Sunday, 26 May||2pm
|- bgcolor="#FFFFFF"
|Essendon reserves|| 18.3 (111)||Port Melbourne|| 16.13 (109) ||Windy Hill||Sunday, 26 May||2pm
|- bgcolor="#FFFFFF"
|Bendigo Diggers|| 8.9 (57) ||Northern Bullants|| 30.19 (199) ||Queen Elizabeth Oval||Sunday, 26 May||2pm

Round 9

|- bgcolor="#CCCCFF"
| Home team
| Home team score
| Away team
| Away team score
| Ground
| Date
| Time
|- bgcolor="#FFFFFF"
|Frankston|| 7.9 (51) ||Box Hill Hawks|| 30.13 (193) ||Frankston Oval||Saturday, 1 June||2pm
|- bgcolor="#FFFFFF"
|Carlton reserves|| 24.20 (164) ||Tasmania|| 6.5 (41) ||Optus Oval||Saturday, 1 June||2pm
|- bgcolor="#FFFFFF"
||North Ballarat|| 6.6 (42) ||Springvale||  17.20 (122) ||Northern Oval||Saturday, 1 June||2pm
|- bgcolor="#FFFFFF"
|Essendon reserves|| 11.12 (78) ||Murray Kangaroos|| 26.18 (174) ||Windy Hill||Saturday, 1 June||2pm
|- bgcolor="#FFFFFF"
|Sandringham|| 9.9 (63) ||Geelong reserves|| 16.12 (108) ||Trevor Barker Beach Oval||Sunday, 2 June||2pm
|- bgcolor="#FFFFFF"
|Werribee|| 12.11 (83) ||Coburg Tigers|| 14.11 (95) ||Chirnside Park||Sunday, 2 June||2pm
|- bgcolor="#FFFFFF"
|Port Melbourne|| 20.10 (130) ||Williamstown|| 16.19 (115) ||TEAC Oval||Sunday, 2 June||2pm
|- bgcolor="#FFFFFF"
|Northern Bullants|| 24.15 (159) ||Tasmania|| 9.5 (59) ||Preston City Oval||Sunday, 2 June||2pm

Ladder

Finals Series

Grand Final

Awards
The Jim 'Frosty' Miller Medal was won for the fourth consecutive year by Nick Sautner (Frankston), who kicked 93 goals.
The J. J. Liston Trophy was won by Sam Mitchell (Box Hill). In the most dominant Liston Trophy performance in history, Mitchell polled 31 votes in only eleven games, including ten best-on-ground performances. Dean Talbot (Coburg) was second with 19 votes, and Mark Bradley (Bendigo) was third with 18 votes.
The Fothergill-Round Medal was won by Michael Firrito (Box Hill).
Williamstown won the reserves premiership. Williamstown 11.15 (81) defeated Werribee 10.14 (74) in the Grand Final, held as a curtain-raiser to the Seniors Grand Final on 22 September.

Notable events
In Round 13,  11.5 (71) trailed  18.14 (122) by 51 points at three-quarter time, before kicking nine goals to no score in the final quarter to win the game by nine points, 20.11 (131) d. 18.14 (122).

See also 
 List of VFA/VFL premiers
 Australian Rules Football
 Victorian Football League
 Australian Football League
 2002 AFL season

References

External links
2002 VFL Premiership Season - Australian Football

Victorian Football League seasons
VFL